Cindy May McGuire (born June 27, 1996) is an Indonesian medical doctor, actress, beauty pageant titleholder who was crowned Puteri Indonesia Lingkungan 2022. She was also a 2022 G20 Ambassador in this role. She represented Indonesia in the Miss International 2022 pageant held in Tokyo, Japan.

Early life and education
McGuire was born in Cirebon, West Java, Indonesia to an American father Alexandrew Davidson McGuire from Philadelphia, Pennsylvania, and a Sundanese-Betawis mother Nelly Yulistine from Ciamis Regency, West Java. She is also the niece of an American actress, Dorothy Hackett McGuire. She grew up in several countries: the United States, United Arab Emirates, Netherlands, Australia, Singapore, as well as Bandung and Ciamis in West Java, Indonesia.

McGuire studied at Leongatha Secondary College in Leongatha, Victoria, Australia. She completed her Bachelor of Medicine (BM) in Professional Medical Program and a Doctor of Medicine (MD) from the Bandung Islamic University in Bandung, West Java. She is currently  pursuing a Double master's degree program, Master of Health Leadership and Management (MHL) and Master of Infectious Diseases Intelligence (MIDI) from the University of New South Wales in Sydney, Australia.

Career

On 31 May 2022, together with her fellow Puteri Indonesia 2022 winners, Laksmi Shari De-Neefe Suardana and Adinda Cresheilla, McGuire was appointed as the 2022 G20 Ambassador by the President of the Republic of Indonesia, Joko Widodo, at the Merdeka Palace, as part of the Indonesian presidency at the upcoming seventeenth meeting of the Group of Twenty (G20) in Bali, where the ambassadors also accompanied by Minister of Tourism and Creative Economy, Sandiaga Uno.

Pageantry

Miss Tourism World Indonesia 2021
At the end of 2020, the Miss Tourism World Indonesia organization officially announced that they had appointed McGuire as Miss Tourism World Indonesia 2021. Due to the COVID-19 pandemic the Miss Tourism World organization has canceled the annual international pageant, which going to be held in Antalya, Turkey.

Puteri Jakarta SCR 2022
In 2022, McGuire participated in the Puteri Jakarta SCR 2022, where she was successfully selected as the representative of Jakarta SCR-5.

Puteri Indonesia 2022
As the winner of Jakarta SCR-5, she represented Jakarta SCR-5 at the national pageant of Puteri Indonesia 2022, held in Jakarta Convention Center, Jakarta, Indonesia, on 27 May 2022. During the pageant quarantine, she was selected as one of the 3 winners for the "Miss Talent" award, with her Beksi Silat performance.

During the finale, McGuire was asked by Minister of Health of The Republic of Indonesia, Budi Gunadi Sadikin whether she has any solution that she would like to change to bring awareness for Stunted growth prevalence. She answered,

At the end of the event, she was successfully crowned as the winner of "Puteri Indonesia Lingkungan 2022" by her predecessor Puteri Indonesia Lingkungan 2020, Putu Ayu Saraswati of Bali. McGuire was crowned along with her fellow Puteri Indonesia 2022 Queens; Laksmi Shari De-Neefe Suardana and Adinda Cresheilla.

During the finale coronation night, Putu Ayu Saraswati announced that she was withdrawing from the Miss International competition, and handed over her duties as Miss International Indonesia 2022 to McGuire. The coronation night was attended by Miss International 2019, Sireethorn Leearamwat of Thailand who sit as the selection committee.

Miss International 2022

As the winner of Puteri Indonesia Lingkungan 2022, McGuire represented Indonesia at the 60th edition of the Miss International competition, held at Tokyo Dome City Hall, Tokyo, Japan on December 13, 2022, and was unplaced.

Filmography
McGuire began her acting career in the Television show Opera Van Java in 2020, Anak Sekolah in 2021, and Lapor Pak! in 2021, which produced and aired by Trans7.

Television Shows

References

External links

 Puteri Indonesia's official website
 Miss International's official website

Living people
1996 births
Betawi people
Sundanese people
University of New South Wales alumni
Bandung Islamic University alumni
Puteri Indonesia winners
Indonesian beauty pageant winners
Indonesian female models
Health activists
Elder rights activists
Child activists
Education activists
Open access activists
Indonesian human rights activists
Indonesian activists
Indonesian actresses
Indonesian stage actresses
Indonesian film actresses
Indonesian television actresses
21st-century Indonesian actresses
People from Cirebon
People from Jakarta
Actresses from Jakarta
Indonesian people of American descent